Mohammed Sujan (born 1 June 1982) is a retired Bangladeshi professional footballer who played as a defender and at times was deployed as a defensive midfielder. He played for the Bangladesh national team from 2001 to 2013. He was also an integral member of the 2003 SAFF Gold Cup winning Bangladesh team.

Club career

Controversies
During 2008, Sujan took half his contract money from Abahani Limited Dhaka and was supposed to stay with the club that season. However, Sujan decided to return to his former club Brothers Union. Nevertheless, due to the controversy Sujan ended up returning to Abahani the following season.

International career
On 8 February 2001, Sujan made his debut for the Bangladesh national football team against Vietnam, during the 2002 FIFA World Cup qualifiers. During the qualifiers, Sujan scored a brace against Mongolia and helped Bangladesh come from behind to take the lead. However, after a late equalizer saw the game end in a 2-2 draw. Sujan played four out of the five matches during the 2003 SAFF Gold Cup. He helped Bangladesh keep a solid defense as they only conceded twice during the entire tournament. On 1 January 2003 after a 1–1 stalemate during the final of the tournament, against Maldives, Sujan stepped up to take the last penalty during the shootout and kept his nerves as Bangladesh won their first ever SAFF Championship. The match is seen as one of the most important matches in the countries footballing history.

After a six year absence from the national team, newly appointed head coach Nikola Ilievski recalled Sujan in 2011, after watching his performances in the league with Dhanmondi Club. Ilievski made Sujan the captain of the national team during the 2011 SAFF Championships. However, under his leadership Bangladesh crashed out of the tournament after being defeated 3–1 by rivals Maldives during the last group-stage game. The team was heavily criticized due to their individual mistakes, in the end costing them a place in the knockout stages. On 4 March 2013, Sujan made his last appearance for the national team against Nepal during the 2014 AFC Challenge Cup qualifiers. Sujan made a total of 36 appearances and scored 3 goals for his country during his twelve year long international career.

Career statistics

International caps

International goals

Bangladesh U23

Bangladesh

Honours

Club
Abahani Limited Dhaka
Bangladesh Premier League: 2008–09, 2009–10,

Sheikh Jamal
Bangladesh Premier League: 2010–11

Muktijoddha Sangsad KC
National Football Championship: 2003
Bangladesh Federation Cup: 2001, 2003

International 

Bangladesh
SAFF Championship: 2003

Awards and accolades
2005 − Sports Writers Association's Best Footballer Award.

References

1982 births
Living people
Bangladeshi footballers
Bangladesh international footballers
Bangladesh youth international footballers
Association football defenders
Footballers from Dhaka
People from Narayanganj District
Asian Games competitors for Bangladesh
Footballers at the 2002 Asian Games
Muktijoddha Sangsad KC players
Bangladesh Football Premier League players
Abahani Limited (Dhaka) players
Abahani Limited (Chittagong) players
Brothers Union players
Sheikh Jamal Dhanmondi Club players